Evergestis atrapuncta is a moth in the family Crambidae. It was described by Koen V. N. Maes in 2011. It is found in Namibia.

References

Evergestis
Moths described in 2011
Moths of Africa